libHaru is a free, open-source, cross platform library for generating PDF files for applications written in C or C++.
It is not intended for reading and editing existing PDF files.

It supports the following features:
 Generating PDF files with lines, text, images.
 Outline, text annotation, link annotation.
 Compressing document with deflate-decode.
 Embedding PNG, Jpeg images.
 Embedding Type1 font and TrueType font.
 Creating encrypted PDF files.
 Using various character sets (ISO8859-1~16, MS CP1250~8, KOI8-R).
 Supporting CJK fonts and encodings.

Supporting compilers and programming languages 

libHaru is written in ANSI C and should compile easily with any compliant C compiler.

It tested in the following environment:
 Cygwin + GCC (Microsoft Windows).
 Cygwin + MinGW (Microsoft Windows).
 Microsoft VC++ (Microsoft Windows).
 Borland C++ (Microsoft Windows).
 GCC (Linux, FreeBSD, NetBSD, Solaris...).

libHaru can be used as a static library or as a dynamic library.

When you use it as static-library, it can be used by C and a C++.
But when you use it as shared-library, it can be used by many development languages which support shared library.

libharu provides bindings for programming languages:
 C++
 C#
 Delphi
 FreeBASIC
 Free Pascal
 Python
 Ruby
 Visual Basic
 PHP
 Perl
 Lua
 JavaScript

References 

Free software programmed in C
PDF software